More Rain is the eighth studio album by American singer-songwriter M. Ward. The album was released on March 4, 2016, on Merge Records and Bella Union. More Rain is Ward's first solo album since 2012's A Wasteland Companion, having released Volume Three and Classics with Zooey Deschanel as She & Him in the interim as well as recording and producing other artists.

Background 
Ward began working on More Rain in 2012, initially experimenting with layering his own vocals to create a doo-wop record. After collaborating with other artists on the record like Peter Buck, k.d. lang, and Neko Case, the sound of the album went in a different direction, described as “true gotta-stay-indoors, rainy-season record that looks upwards through the weather while reflecting on his past.”

Critical reception 

More Rain received a weighted average score of 72 out of 100, based on eleven critical reviews, by review aggregator Metacritic, indicating "generally favorable reviews." A review in the April 2016 issue of Uncut said, "The lack of ironic twists is both slightly unsettling and hugely refreshing," and David Harvey of Record Collector called the album "a dreamy deluge." Andrew Gordon of The Skinny said the album is "decisively easygoing," after saying, "If you’re scanning these pages for a record your granny might be into, this is the one." Dean Van Nguyen of Consequence of Sound gave the album a D+, or a 33 out of 100 according to Metacritic, stating that, "All the expected points have been hit on More Rain, but the record comes off as slack and slapdash."

Track listing 
All songs written by M. Ward except "You're So Good to Me" written by Brian Wilson

Personnel
 M. Ward – vocals, guitar, mandolin, keyboards
 Mike Coykendall – bass, guitar, percussion
 Joey Spampinato – bass
 Mark Powers – drums, percussion
 Scott McPherson – drums, percussion
 Mike Mogis – mandolin, pedal steel, Moog synthesizer
 Nathaniel Walcott – flugelhorn
 Paul Brainard – pedal steel, trumpet
 Peter Buck – guitar, mandolin
 Scott McCaughey – bass, guitar, organ
 Susan Sanchez – backing vocals
 The Secret Sisters – backing vocals
 k.d. lang – backing vocals
 Neko Case – backing vocals

Charts

References

External links 
 M. Ward's official homepage
 More Rain on Merge Records

M. Ward albums
2016 albums